The 2015 Epping Forest District Council election took place on 7 May 2015 to elect members of Epping Forest District Council in England. This was on the same day as other local elections.

This election marks the last time a Labour councillor sat in the chamber after Peter Gode of Shelley stood down - a dramatic decline following Labour being the largest party in the mid-1990s.

By-elections

Epping Hemnall By-election
A by-election was held on 25 September 2014 following the death of Mayor Ken Avey. Liberal Democrat, Kim Adams won with 43% of the vote compared to 28% for the Conservative party and 24% to UKIP. This election reversed this by-election result with Avey's son, Nigel replacing him, ousting the Liberal Democrat councillor

Broadley Common, Epping Forest & Nazeing By-election

Ward Results

Figures are compared to the last time these seats were contested in any election cycle for the Epping Forest District Council election, this is indicated.

Broadley Common, Epping Forest & Nazeing

Buckhurst Hill West

Chipping Ongar, Greensted & Marden Ash

Epping Hemnall

Epping Lindsey & Thornwood Common

Grange Hill

Hastingwood, Matching & Sheering Village

Lambourne

Lower Nazeing

Lower Sheering

North Weald Bassett

Roydon

Shelley

Waltham Abbey High Beach

Waltham Abbey Honey Lane

Waltham Abbey North East

Waltham Abbey Paternoster

Waltham Abbey South West

References

2015 English local elections
May 2015 events in the United Kingdom
2015
2010s in Essex